Charles Gross (born 13 May 1934) is an American film and TV composer, living in New York City. 

Gross, born in Boston, Massachusetts, was educated at Harvard University (BA), the New England Conservatory and Mills College (teaching fellowship), and a student of Darius Milhaud. He arranged for the West Point Band for three years, and served in the US Army. Later, he became a writer for industrial films and cartoons.

He has written original music for the 1976 Broadway production of The Eccentricities of a Nightingale.

His film and television scores included Valdez Is Coming (1971), The Tenth Level (1976), Blue Sunshine (1978), The Dain Curse (1978), Heartland (1979), My Body, My Child (1982), Terrible Joe Moran (1984), Country (1984), The Burning Bed (1984), The Night They Saved Christmas (1984), Arthur the King (1985), Sweet Dreams (1985), Between Two Women (1986), Punchline (1988), Turner & Hooch (1989), Air America (1990), Another You (1991), A Family Thing (1996), and Fakin' Da Funk (1997).

External links

References

1934 births
Living people
American film score composers
American television composers
Harvard University alumni
Mills College alumni
Musicians from New York City
New England Conservatory alumni
Members of the United States National Academy of Sciences